The 2018–19 Hong Kong Sapling Cup was the 4th edition of the Sapling Cup, and was the first time in history without name sponsorship. The Cup was contested by the 10 teams in the 2018–19 Hong Kong Premier League. The objective of the Cup was to create more potential playing opportunities for youth players. Each team were required to field a minimum of two players born on or after 1 January 1997 (U-22) and a maximum of six foreign players during every whole match, with no more than four foreign players on the pitch at the same time. 

Kitchee were the defending champions, but they were eliminated after failing to get out of group stage. Lee Man became the champions for the first time after beating Yuen Long in the final. This is also Lee Man's first title in club history.

Calendar

Group stage

Group A

Group B

Semi-finals
The two semi-finals took place on 13–14 April 2019 at Mong Kok Stadium.

Final
The final took place on 27 April 2019 at Mong Kok Stadium.

Top scorers

References

2018–19 domestic association football cups
Sapling Cup
Hong Kong Sapling Cup